Stanley Robinson may refer to:
Stan Robinson (1936–2017), English jazz musician
Stanley Robinson (basketball) (1988–2020), American basketball player
Stanley Robinson (numismatist) (1887–1976), English numismatist
Substantial (rapper) or Stanley Robinson (born 1979), American rapper
Stan Robinson (rugby league) (1911–1995), Australian rugby league player
Stanley L. Robinson (1890–1967), American football player